Daventry University Technical College was a University technical college (UTC) in Daventry, Northamptonshire, England which opened in September 2013. The UTC specialised in engineering, construction and environmental sustainability.

Daventry UTC had the capacity to provide education for up to 600 14- to 19-year-olds. It closed in July 2017 due to low enrollment. The building was taken over by The Parker E-ACT Academy from September 2017.

The UTC was sponsored by the University of Northampton, Moulton College and local businesses.

References

External links
 Daventry District Council

Defunct schools in West Northamptonshire District
Educational institutions established in 2013
Educational institutions disestablished in 2017
2013 establishments in England
University of Northampton
Daventry
Defunct University Technical Colleges